Phyllonorycter sorbicola is a moth of the family Gracillariidae. It is known from Japan (the islands of Hokkaido and Shikoku) and the Russian Far East.

The wingspan is 6–7 mm.

The larvae feed as leaf miners on Sorbus matsumurana, Sorbus commixta, Sorbus alnifolia, Prunus avium, Malus pumila and Malus asiatica. The mine is ptychonomous and located on the lower surface of the leaf.

References

sorbicola
Moths of Japan
Moths of Asia

Moths described in 1963
Taxa named by Tosio Kumata
Leaf miners